Kurt Van Raefelghem is a Paralympian athlete from Belgium competing mainly in category P13 pentathlon events.

Biography
He competed in the 1992 Summer Paralympics in Barcelona, Spain.  There he won a silver medal in the men's Long jump - B3 event, finished seventh in the men's 100 metres - B3 event and finished sixth in the men's 200 metres - B3 event.  He also competed at the 1996 Summer Paralympics in Atlanta, United States., a silver medal in the men's Pentathlon - P12 event and a bronze medal in the men's Long jump - F12 event.  He also competed at the 2000 Summer Paralympics in Sydney, Australia., a gold medal in the men's Pentathlon - P13 event, went out in the first round of the men's 100 metres - T13 event and finished fourth in the men's Long jump - F13 event.  He also competed in the 2004 Summer Paralympics in Athens, Greece.  There he won a bronze medal in the men's Pentathlon - P13 event and finished fifteenth in the men's Long jump - F12 event.

External links
 

Paralympic athletes of Belgium
Athletes (track and field) at the 1992 Summer Paralympics
Athletes (track and field) at the 1996 Summer Paralympics
Athletes (track and field) at the 2000 Summer Paralympics
Athletes (track and field) at the 2004 Summer Paralympics
Paralympic gold medalists for Belgium
Paralympic silver medalists for Belgium
Paralympic bronze medalists for Belgium
Living people
Medalists at the 1992 Summer Paralympics
Medalists at the 1996 Summer Paralympics
Medalists at the 2000 Summer Paralympics
Medalists at the 2004 Summer Paralympics
Year of birth missing (living people)
Paralympic medalists in athletics (track and field)
Belgian male long jumpers
Visually impaired long jumpers
Paralympic long jumpers